This is a list of the mammal species recorded in Jamaica. Of the mammal species in Jamaica, one is endangered, four are vulnerable, and two are considered to be extinct.

The following tags are used to highlight each species' conservation status as assessed by the International Union for Conservation of Nature:

Some species were assessed using an earlier set of criteria. Species assessed using this system have the following instead of near threatened and least concern categories:

Order: Sirenia (manatees and dugongs) 

Sirenia is an order of fully aquatic, herbivorous mammals that inhabit rivers, estuaries, coastal marine waters, swamps, and marine wetlands. All four species are endangered.

Family: Trichechidae
Genus: Trichechus
 West Indian manatee, T. manatus VU

Order: Primates (primates) 

There are 190 – 448 species of living primates, depending on which classification is used. They have an opposable thumb for grasping objects.
Suborder: Haplorhini
Infraorder: Simiiformes
Family: Pitheciidae
Subfamily: Callicebinae
Tribe: Xenotrichini
Genus: Xenothrix
 Jamaican monkey, X. mcgregori

Order: Rodentia (rodents) 
Rodents make up the largest order of mammals, with over 40% of mammalian species. They have two incisors in the upper and lower jaw which grow continually and must be kept short by gnawing.

Suborder: Hystricomorpha
Family: Capromyidae
Subfamily: Capromyinae
Genus: Geocapromys
 Jamaican coney, Geocapromys brownii VU
Suborder: Myomorpha
Family: Cricetidae
Subfamily: Sigmodontinae
Genus: Oryzomys
 Jamaican rice rat, Oryzomys antillarum  EX
Suborder: Muridae
Family: Muridae
Genus: Rattus
 Brown rat, Rattus norvegicus  introduced
 Black rat, Rattus rattus  introduced
Genus: Mus
 House mouse, Mus musculus  introduced

Order: Chiroptera (bats) 

The bats' most distinguishing feature is that their forelimbs are developed as wings, making them the only mammals capable of flight. Bat species account for about 20% of all mammals.

Family: Noctilionidae
Genus: Noctilio
 Greater bulldog bat, Noctilio leporinus LR/lc
Family: Vespertilionidae
Subfamily: Vespertilioninae
Genus: Lasiurus
 Eastern red bat, Lasiurus borealis LR/lc
Family: Molossidae
Genus: Eumops
 Wagner's bonneted bat, Eumops glaucinus LR/lc
Genus: Molossus
 Velvety free-tailed bat, Molossus molossus LR/lc
Genus: Nyctinomops
 Big free-tailed bat, Nyctinomops macrotis LR/lc
Genus: Tadarida
 Mexican free-tailed bat, Tadarida brasiliensis LR/nt
Family: Mormoopidae
Genus: Mormoops
 Antillean ghost-faced bat, Mormoops blainvillii LR/nt
Genus: Pteronotus
 Macleay's mustached bat, Pteronotus macleayii VU
 Parnell's mustached bat, Pteronotus parnellii LR/lc
 Sooty mustached bat, Pteronotus quadridens LR/nt
Family: Phyllostomidae
Subfamily: Phyllostominae
Genus: Macrotus
 Waterhouse's leaf-nosed bat, Macrotus waterhousii LR/lc
Genus: Vampyrum
 Spectral bat, Vampyrum spectrum LR/nt
Subfamily: Brachyphyllinae
Genus: Brachyphylla
 Cuban fruit-eating bat, Brachyphylla nana LC extirpated
Subfamily: Phyllonycterinae
Genus: Erophylla
 Buffy flower bat, Erophylla sezekorni LR/lc
Genus: Phyllonycteris
 Jamaican flower bat, Phyllonycteris aphylla EN
Subfamily: Glossophaginae
Genus: Glossophaga
 Pallas's long-tongued bat, Glossophaga soricina LR/lc
Genus: Monophyllus
 Leach's single leaf bat, Monophyllus redmani LR/lc
Subfamily: Carolliinae
Genus: Carollia
 Seba's short-tailed bat, Carollia perspicillata LR/lc
Subfamily: Stenodermatinae
Genus: Ariteus
 Jamaican fig-eating bat, Ariteus flavescens VU
Genus: Artibeus
 Jamaican fruit bat, Artibeus jamaicensis LR/lc
Genus: Sturnira
 Little yellow-shouldered bat, Sturnira lilium LR/lc
Family: NatalidaeGenus: Chilonatalus Cuban funnel-eared bat, Chilonatalus micropus LR/lc

 Order: Cetacea (whales) 

The order Cetacea includes whales, dolphins and porpoises. They are the mammals most fully adapted to aquatic life with a spindle-shaped nearly hairless body, protected by a thick layer of blubber, and forelimbs and tail modified to provide propulsion underwater.

Suborder: Mysticeti
Family: Balaenopteridae (baleen whales)
Genus: Balaenoptera 
 Common minke whale, Balaenoptera acutorostrata Sei whale, Balaenoptera borealis Bryde's whale, Balaenoptera brydei Blue whale, Balaenoptera musculusGenus: Megaptera Humpback whale, Megaptera novaeangliaeSuborder: Odontoceti
Superfamily: Platanistoidea
Family: Delphinidae (marine dolphins)
Genus: Delphinus Short-beaked common dolphin, Delphinus delphis DD
Genus: Feresa Pygmy killer whale, Feresa attenuata DD
Genus: Globicephala Short-finned pilot whale, Globicephala macrorhyncus DD
Genus: Lagenodelphis Fraser's dolphin, Lagenodelphis hosei DD
Genus: Grampus Risso's dolphin, Grampus griseus DD
Genus: Orcinus Killer whale, Orcinus orca DD
Genus: Peponocephala Melon-headed whale, Peponocephala electra DD
Genus: Pseudorca False killer whale, Pseudorca crassidens DD
Genus: Stenella Pantropical spotted dolphin, Stenella attenuata DD
 Clymene dolphin, Stenella clymene DD
 Striped dolphin, Stenella coeruleoalba DD
 Atlantic spotted dolphin, Stenella frontalis DD
 Spinner dolphin, Stenella longirostris DD
Genus: Steno Rough-toothed dolphin, Steno bredanensis DD
Genus: Tursiops Common bottlenose dolphin, Tursiops truncatusFamily: Physeteridae (sperm whales)
Genus: Physeter Sperm whale, Physeter catodon DD
Family: Kogiidae (dwarf sperm whales)
Genus: Kogia Pygmy sperm whale, Kogia breviceps DD
 Dwarf sperm whale, Kogia sima DD
Superfamily Ziphioidea
Family: Ziphidae (beaked whales)
Genus: Mesoplodon Gervais' beaked whale, Mesoplodon europaeus DD
Genus: Ziphius Cuvier's beaked whale, Ziphius cavirostris DD

 Order: Carnivora (carnivorans) 

There are over 260 species of carnivorans, the majority of which feed primarily on meat. They have a characteristic skull shape and dentition. 
Suborder: Procyonidae
Family: Procyonidae
Genus: Procyon Raccoon, P. lotor  introduced, extirpated
Family: Herpestidae
Genus: Urva Small Indian mongoose, U. auropunctata  introduced
Suborder: Pinnipedia
Family: Phocidae (earless seals)
Genus: Neomonachus Caribbean monk seal, N. tropicalis 

 Order: Artiodactyla (even-toed ungulates) 

The even-toed ungulates are ungulates – hoofed animals – which bear weight equally on two (an even number) of their five toes: the third and fourth. The other three toes are either present, absent, vestigial, or pointing posteriorly.
Family: Cervidae
Subfamily: Capreolinae
Genus: Odocoileus White-tailed deer, Odocoileus virginianus  introduced
Family Suidae (pigs)
Genus: SusWild boar, Sus scrofa''  introduced

See also
List of chordate orders
Lists of mammals by region
List of prehistoric mammals
Mammal classification
List of mammals described in the 2000s

Notes

References
 

Jamaica

Mammals
Jamaica